Steffany Huckaby is an American actress.

Career 
She is best known for her role as Beth in the television series, Greek. She starred in the horror film, Death Tunnel and The Pleasure Drivers as Casey Ethot. She also received strong reviews for her theatrical performance as Kia in the play The Last Schwartz. She portrayed Kathy Baker in the 2010 Bollywood film, My Name Is Khan.

Filmography

References

External links

American television actresses
Living people
Actresses in Hindi cinema
Year of birth missing (living people)
American film actresses
21st-century American women